9736140 Canada Inc., doing business as Pascan Aviation, is a regional airline based in Longueuil, Quebec, Canada. Based at Montreal Saint-Hubert Longueuil Airport in the Saint-Hubert borough of Longueuil. Pascan operates scheduled flights within Quebec, Ontario and Labrador as well as charter services. Its main base is Montreal Saint-Hubert Longueuil Airport and it runs a fixed-base operator at the airport.

History 

The airline was established in 1999 by Serge Charron. Since then, the company has established itself as an independent regional airline in Quebec and claims to be the largest in the province. Pascan connects 12 destinations throughout Quebec, Ontario and Newfoundland and Labrador.

Destinations 

As of February 2023 Pascan Aviation operates services to the following domestic scheduled destinations:

Fleet 

As of February 2023, Transport Canada shows 11 registered aircraft According to the Pascan Aviation website they also have at least one Pilatus PC-12.

Former fleet
Former aircraft operated by Pascan Aviation, Pascan Express, and 9736140 Canada Inc. not listed above:
 ATR 42
 Beechcraft King Air
 Piper PA-31 Navajo
 Pilatus PC-12

References

External links 

Regional airlines of Quebec
Companies based in Longueuil
Fixed-base operators